Bacar may refer to:

 Bacar, Mozambique, a village
 Bacar Baldé (born 1992), Bissau-Guinean footballer
 Mohamed Bacar (born 1962), former President of Anjouan, Comoros

See also 
Bakar